Stac Electronics, originally incorporated as State of the Art Consulting and later shortened to Stac, Inc., was a technology company founded in 1983.  It is known primarily for its Lempel–Ziv–Stac lossless compression algorithm and Stacker disk compression utility for compressing data for storage.

History
The original founders included five Caltech graduate students in Computer Science (Gary Clow, Doug Whiting, John Tanner, Mike Schuster and William Dally), two engineers from the industry (Scott Karns and Robert Monsour) and two board members from the industry (Robert Johnson of Southern California Ventures and Hugh Ness of Scientific Atlanta).  The first employee was Bruce Behymer, a Caltech undergraduate in Engineering and Applied Science.

Originally headquartered in Pasadena, California and later in Carlsbad, California, the company received venture capital funding to pursue a business plan as a fabless chip company selling application-specific standard products to the tape drive industry.  The plan was to include expansion into the disk drive market, which was much larger than the tape drive market. Following the success of Cirrus in the disk drive market, this was the real basis for venture capitalists' interest in Stac.

As part of the application engineering to adapt its data compression chips for use in disk drives, the company implemented a DOS driver that transparently compressed data written to a PC hard disk and decompressed the data transparently upon subsequent hard disk reads.  In doing so they discovered that given the relative speed difference between the PC processor and the disk drive access times, it was possible to perform the data compression in software, obviating the need for a data compression chip in every disk drive, as they were planning to produce.  This DOS driver was written in x86 assembly language under contract by Paul Houle.

In 1990 the company released Stacker, a disk compression utility.  The product was highly successful, due to the relatively small capacities (20 to 80 megabytes) and high prices of contemporary hard drives, at a time when larger software packages such as Microsoft's new Windows user interface were becoming popular.  On average, Stacker doubled disk capacity, and usually increased disk performance by compressing the data before writing and after reading, compensating for the relative slowness of the drives.  Stac sold several million units of Stacker over the product's lifetime.

They also released a hardware product called STAC Coprocessor Card, which claimed to not only improve the compression of the files, but to decrease the time needed to compress files. Salient Software would license Stac's acceleration technology for use in their NuBus DoubleUp and PDS Bullet cards for the Macintosh, though they would use Salient's own DiskDoubler software.

After 1994
At some time prior to 1996, the company relocated its main office from Carlsbad to Carmel Valley, in San Diego, and maintained a programming group in Estonia. After settling the lawsuit with Microsoft, Stac attempted to expand its product portfolio in the utility software segment by adding additional storage and communication titles through internal development and acquisition.  The company scrambled to replace the revenues lost after the market for hard drive compression software collapsed with the inclusion of DoubleSpace in MS-DOS and the rapid decline in hard disk cost per megabyte.  Using the funds from its IPO (1992) and the settlement with Microsoft, Stac acquired a remote desktop software product called "ReachOut".  It acquired a server image backup product, "Replica", and internally developed a network backup product for workstations and laptops, and marketed this product first as "Replica NDM" and later as "eSupport Essentials".  Much of the technology pioneered in Stac's network backup offering ultimately found its way into today's online backup solutions.

Meanwhile, Stac's original chip business continued to grow.  In order to realize shareholder value, its chip subsidiary called Hifn, was spun off in 1998 in a primary public offering.

Stac then renamed the remaining utility software company to "Previo", and repositioned itself as a help desk and support organization tool provider.  This effort was pursued while the dot-com bubble was bursting, and in 2002 management elected to take the unusual step of selling Stac's remaining technology assets (to Altiris) and returning its remaining cash to shareholders before dissolving.

Controversy

Microsoft lawsuit 
In 1993, Microsoft released MS-DOS 6.0, which included a disk compression program called DoubleSpace.  Microsoft had previously been in discussions with Stac to license its compression technology, and had discussions with Stac engineers and examined Stac's code as part of the due diligence process.  Stac, in an effort led by attorney Morgan Chu, sued Microsoft for infringement of two of its data compression patents. Meanwhile, Microsoft had filed an injunction against Stac to prevent the company from selling its Stacker 3.1 software for Windows and DOS, attracting claims from Stac representatives that with a licensing deal having been made with rival DOS vendor, Novell, and with Microsoft no longer facing action from the Federal Communications Commission, the company had become emboldened to "dominate the data compression market". In 1994, a California jury ruled the infringement by Microsoft was not willful, but awarded Stac $120 million in compensatory damages, coming to about $5.50 per copy of MS-DOS 6.0 that had been sold. The jury also agreed with a Microsoft counterclaim that Stac had misappropriated the Microsoft trade secret of a pre-loading feature that was included in Stacker 3.1, and simultaneously awarded Microsoft $13.6 million on the counterclaim.

While Microsoft prepared an appeal, Stac obtained a preliminary injunction from the court stopping the sales of all MS-DOS products that included DoubleSpace; by this time Microsoft had already started shipping an "upgrade" of MS-DOS to its OEM customers that removed DoubleSpace.  By the end of 1994, Microsoft and Stac settled all pending litigation by agreeing that Microsoft would make a $39.9 million investment in Stac Electronics, and additionally pay Stac about $43 million in royalties on their patents.

See also
 Hifn
 Novell DOS 7, OpenDOS 7.01, DR-DOS 7.02 and higher
 PC DOS 7 and PC DOS 2000
 DOS Protected Mode Services
 Multimedia Stacker
 Disk compression
 File Allocation Table
 Comparison of file systems

References

External links
 
 Previo support page on Altiris site
 Microsoft KB showing installation notes for both the software and hardware for Windows 3.x (copy on GitHub )

Defunct software companies of the United States
Software companies based in California
Technology companies based in Greater Los Angeles
Software companies established in 1983
Technology companies disestablished in 2002
1983 establishments in California
2002 disestablishments in California
Companies based in Pasadena, California
Companies based in Carlsbad, California
Defunct manufacturing companies based in Greater Los Angeles
Microsoft criticisms and controversies